The Palace Law (also spelled) is a class of legal texts in the history of Thailand, dating from the Ayutthaya period (14th–18th centuries). It prescribed the functions of the monarchy, royal court and government, probably serving like a constitution during early Ayutthaya. It was one of the 27 laws compiled in the 1805 Three Seals Code on the orders of King Rama I, following the fall of Ayutthaya.

Today, a handful of palace laws dating from the reign of King Vajiravudh (Rama VI, r. 1910–1925) remain in force, the most significant of which is the 1924 Palace Law of Succession, which is deferred to by the constitution.

References

Citations

Bibliography

Law of Thailand
Thai monarchy